Chris Pierce is an American singer, songwriter, producer, multi-instrumentalist, public speaker, wine producer and officiant born and based in California.

Early life
Pierce is from Pasadena, California. He grew up singing in church and playing in bands from an early age and listened to classic soul, rhythm and blues, jazz, gospel and rock and roll recordings. When he was 15 he was diagnosed with otosclerosis which caused him to lose significant hearing. A surgery helped him regain 70% of his hearing in his right year. In his teenage years, he pursued acting and singing in local theater presentations and appeared on notable television shows such as Kids Incorporated, Big Break hosted by Natalie Cole, Star Search and Half and Half.

While still in high school, Pierce began playing gigs with Grammy-nominated rock musician Jon Butcher. After high school he received a scholarship to study jazz at USC. At 19 years old he performed on a US tour with Sonia Dada and later continued on to Moscow, Russia. After touring with Sonia Dada, Pierce came home to Southern California to work on his degree in jazz studies at USC. In 2005, Pierce met Seal at a house party and later joined him as his opening act on a world tour. Pierce says, "I kinda got discovered by him... That opened up a bunch of different things."

Career
For over a decade Pierce has been recording and doing independent road tours and playing up to 150 shows a year. He has opened for B.B. King, Seal, Rodrigo y Gabriela, Jill Scott, Aaron Neville, Colbie Caillat, Al Green, Jamie Cullum, Toots & The Maytals, and Robert Cray. In 2021, Chris Pierce's cover of "No One" by Alicia Keys was featured on the ABC television series A Million Little Things and the single was released by Hollywood Records. Chris Pierce also co-wrote the hit song "We Can Always Come Back To This" which was featured 3 times on the NBC drama This Is Us. The song peaked at #1 on the Billboard Blues Chart and #12 on iTunes's Top 100.

His songs have also been featured in film and television like Crash, Brothers and Sisters, In Plain Sight, True Blood, Eli Stone, What About Brian, Lincoln Heights, Army Wives, North Shore, Half and Half, Dawson's Creek, Sister Act, Great Plains and The Long Shots starring Ice Cube. His single "Are You Beautiful" has been used in a national Banana Republic ad campaign.

Reception
Critic Paul Saitowitz of The Press-Enterprise has compared Pierce's voice to Ray Charles, writing that it "fluctuates from delicate falsettos to shrieks reminiscent of Ray Charles". In a concert review, the San Antonio Express-News wrote that he has "one of the most powerful voices going."

Chris Pierce's 2021 album, American Silence, garnered critical acclaim from NPR, SiriusXM, The Bluegrass Situation, Acoustic Guitar, No Depression, Rolling Stone, Americana UK and more for its strong racial justice themes. NPR'''s Robin Hilton said, "I haven't been so deeply, deeply move by just a person and their guitar like this in a long time. Rolling Stone wrote, "American Silence is the sound of everyone who's hungry for change, steadying themselves and marching toward a common goal." No Depression noted the timelines of the album's release around the worldwide racial justice uprisings: "Chris Pierce's American Silence is one of those albums that truly feels like a lifetime in the making."

Additionally, his song "Keep On Keeping On" was chosen as KCRW's "Today's Top Tune" and he appeared on KCRW's "Morning Becomes Eclectic" with Nic Harcourt, who selected Pierce's album, Walking on The Earth, as "Best Album of July 2008."

Personal life
Pierce currently resides in California. He married actress Tara Buck in 2012. They co-own a wine label called Ledbetter Syrah.

Discography
 American Silence (2021)
 You've Got To Feel It! (2017)
 Reverend Tall Tree' (2015)
 When the Hustle Comes to a Stop (2012)
 I Can Hear You (2011)
 Chris Pierce Live at the Hotel Cafe (2009)
 Walking on the Earth (2007)
 Static Trampoline (2005)
 Intimate Moments (2004)
 Liberation Vol. 1 (2002)

References

External links
 Official website
 
 

Living people
American singer-songwriters
American soul guitarists
American blues musicians
American folk musicians
Year of birth missing (living people)